Verena Ute Hubertz (born 26 November 1987) is a German entrepreneur and politician of the Social Democratic Party (SPD) who has been serving as a member of the Bundestag from the state of Rhineland-Palatinate since 2021.

Early life and education 
Hubertz was born in Trier in 1987 as the daughter of a locksmith and a parish expert worker. She grew up in Konz and Lampaden. After graduating from high school, she studied business administration at Trier University of Applied Sciences (Bachelor) and at WHU - Otto Beisheim School of Management in Vallendar (MSc). She gained her first professional experience at the Lebenshilfe-Werke Trier, Vodafone, PricewaterhouseCoopers and Commerzbank.

Business career 
After successfully completing her studies, she went to Berlin to work with a fellow student to found the startup Kitchen Stories, a video-based cooking platform with over 20 million users and 60 employees. In 2017, BSH became the majority owner of Kitchen Stories. At the end of 2020, she gave up her position as managing director to run for the Bundestag in her home constituency.

Political career 
Hubertz became a member of the Bundestag in the 2021 German federal election. She won the direct mandate in the constituency of Trier with a 5.3% lead over incumbent Andreas Steier. She has since been serving as one her parliamentary group's deputy chairs, under the leadership of chairman Rolf Mützenich.

Other activities

Corporate boards
 KfW, Member of the Board of Supervisory Directors (since 2022)

Non-profit organizations
 Business Forum of the Social Democratic Party of Germany, Member of the Political Advisory Board (since 2022)
 German Association for Small and Medium-Sized Businesses (BVMW), Member of the Political Advisory Board (since 2022)

References

External links 

  
 Bundestag biography 

1987 births
Living people
Members of the Bundestag for Rhineland-Palatinate
Members of the Bundestag 2021–2025
Members of the Bundestag for the Social Democratic Party of Germany